The Big Sky Conference Player of the Year Award, officially known as the Big Sky Conference Most Valuable Player Award, is an annual basketball award given to the Big Sky Conference's most outstanding player. The award was first given following the 1978–79 season. Only one player, Larry Krystkowiak of Montana, has won the award three times (1984–1986). Three others have been two-time winners: Orlando Lightfoot of Idaho (1993, 1994), and Weber State's Harold Arceneaux (1999, 2000) and Damian Lillard (2010, 2012). Weber State has the most all-time awards (11) and individual winners (9). Montana and Eastern Washington are tied for second in total awards with seven apiece.

Key

Winners

Winners by school

Footnotes

References
 
 

NCAA Division I men's basketball conference players of the year
Player
Awards established in 1979